Dalbergia granadillo, the granadillo (a name it shares with a number of other plants) or zangalicua, is a species of flowering plant in the family Fabaceae, native to central and southern Mexico, and El Salvador. A slow-growing tree reaching , it is listed as Critically Endangered due to illegal logging of mature individuals.

References

granadillo
Flora of Central Mexico
Flora of Southeastern Mexico
Flora of Southwestern Mexico
Flora of Veracruz
Flora of El Salvador
Plants described in 1922